86th Street may refer to:
86th Street (Manhattan)
86th Street (IRT Broadway–Seventh Avenue Line) in Manhattan
86th Street (IND Eighth Avenue Line) in Manhattan
86th Street (BMT Fourth Avenue Line) in Brooklyn
86th Street (IRT Lexington Avenue Line) in Manhattan
86th Street (BMT Sea Beach Line) in Brooklyn
86th Street (Second Avenue Subway) in Manhattan
86th Street (IRT Second Avenue Line) in Manhattan; demolished
86th Street (IRT Ninth Avenue Line) in Manhattan; demolished
86th Street station (New York Central Railroad)